Liliana Oliveros Leal (born 27 March 1977) is a Spanish Paralympic archer who competes in international events. She participated in the 2016 Summer Paralympics and reached the quarterfinals in the women's individual W1 and mixed team W1 events with Manuel Sanchez Camus.

References

1977 births
Living people
Paralympic archers of Spain
Spanish female archers
Archers at the 2016 Summer Paralympics